Stanley Draper is a 1974 bronze sculpture by Leonard McMurry, installed outside Oklahoma City's City Hall, in the U.S. state of Oklahoma.

History
The statue was formerly installed in Bicentennial Park. It was surveyed by the Smithsonian Institution's "Save Outdoor Sculpture!" program in 1994. Circa 2013, the artwork was moved from the park to its current location on the east side of the City Hall.

See also

 1974 in art

References

1974 establishments in Oklahoma
1974 sculptures
Bronze sculptures in Oklahoma
Monuments and memorials in Oklahoma
Outdoor sculptures in Oklahoma City
Relocated buildings and structures in the United States
Sculptures of men in Oklahoma
Statues in Oklahoma